The Tenthredinoidea are the dominant superfamily of sawflies within the Symphyta, containing some 8,400 species worldwide, primarily in the family Tenthredinidae. All known larvae are phytophagous, and a number are considered pests.

The included extant families share the distinctive features of a medially narrowed pronotum, paired protibial spurs, and the loss of the transverse mesonotal groove. The superfamily also includes two extinct families. Meicai and Haiyan (1998) identified 66 extant tribes and 17 subfamilies.

Taxonomy

Families 

Argidae Konow, 1890 (58 genera, 897 spp.)
Blasticotomidae Thomson, 1871 (3 genera, 13 spp.) 
Cimbicidae W. Kirby, 1837 (16 genera, 182 spp.) 
Diprionidae Rohwer, 1910 (11 genera, 136 spp.)
Pergidae Rohwer, 1911 (60 genera, 442 spp.)
Tenthredinidae Latreille, 1803 (430 genera, 7,500 spp.)
Zenargidae Rohwer, 1918 (1 genus, 1 sp.)

References

Bibliography 

 , in Zhang, Z.-Q. (ed.) Animal Biodiversity: An Outline of Higher-level Classification and Survey of Taxonomic Richness (Addenda 2013)
 
  
 

 
Hymenoptera superfamilies
Taxa named by Pierre André Latreille